Figueroa Department is a department of Argentina in Santiago del Estero Province.  The capital city of the department is La Cañada.

Settlements
Callejón Bajada
Caspi Corral
La Cañada
La Invernada
La Loma

References

Departments of Santiago del Estero Province